Afzalpur Assembly constituency is one of the 224 Legislative Assembly constituencies of Karnataka state in India. It is in Kalaburagi district and is a segment of Gulbarga Lok Sabha seat.

Members of Assembly

Hyderabad State
 1951: Annarao Basappa, Independent

Mysore State
 1957: Annarao Basappa, Independent
 1962: Annarao Basappa, Indian National Congress
 1967: N. S. Patil, Indian National Congress
 1972: Digambar Rao Balwantrao, Indian National Congress

Karnataka State
 1978:	M. Y. Patil, Janata Party
 1983:	Hanamanth Rao Desai, Janata Party
 1985:	Malikayya Guttedar, Indian National Congress
 1989:	Malikayya Guttedar, Indian National Congress
 1994:	Malikayya Guttedar, Indian National Congress
 1999:	Malikayya Guttedar, Indian National Congress
 2004:	M. Y. Patil, Janata Dal (Secular)
 2008:	Malikayya Guttedar, Indian National Congress
 2013:	Malikayya Guttedar, Indian National Congress

Election results

1967 Assembly Election
 N. S. Patil (INC) : 19,761 votes    
 G. A. R. Basappa (IND) : 7,620

2018

Previous results
Source:

See also 
 List of constituencies of Karnataka Legislative Assembly
Kalaburagi district

References 

Assembly constituencies of Karnataka